Brendan Daly may refer to:

 Brendan Daly (politician) (born 1940), former Fianna Fáil Party politician in Ireland
 Brendan Daly (American football) (born 1975), American football coach
 Brendan Daly (Fair City), character in the Irish TV drama Fair City
 Brendan Daly (rugby union), (born 1990), American rugby union player